Elections were held in Illinois on November 4, 2008.

Primaries were held February 5, 2008.

Election information

Turnout

Primary election
For the primary election, turnout was 40.89%, with 2,986,982 votes cast. 

Turnout by county

General election
For the general election, turnout was 71.60%, with 5,577,509 votes cast.

Turnout by county

Federal elections

United States President

Illinois voted for the Democratic ticket of Barack Obama and Joe Biden.

This was the fifth consecutive presidential election in which Illinois had voted for the Democratic ticket.

United States Senate

Incumbent Democrat Dick Durbin was reelected to a third term.

United States House

All 19 of Illinois’ seats in the United States House of Representatives were up for election in 2008.

The Democratic Party flipped one Republican-held seat, making the composition of Illinois' House delegation 11 Democrats and 8 Republicans.

State elections

State Senate

One-third of the seats of the Illinois Senate were up for election in 2008.

State House of Representatives

All of the seats in the Illinois House of Representatives were up for election in 2008.

Judicial elections
Judicial elections were held.

Ballot measure
Illinois voters voted on a single ballot measure in 1998. In order to be approved, the measure required either 60% support among those specifically voting on the amendment or 50% support among all ballots cast in the elections.

This was the first time since the 1998 Illinois elections that a statewide ballot measure was presented to Illinois voters.

Proposed call for a Constitutional Convention
A measure which would call for a state constitutional convention failed. Article XIV of the Constitution of Illinois requires that Illinois voters be asked at least every 20 years if they desire a constitutional convention, thus this election was constitutionally required to be held.

Local elections
Local elections were held. These included county elections, such as the Cook County elections.

Notes

References

 
Illinois